Bossiaea cordigera , commonly known as wiry bossiaea, is a species of flowering plant in the family Fabaceae and is endemic to southern Australia. It is a straggling shrub with wiry branches, egg-shaped to more or less heart-shaped leaves and yellow and red flowers.

Description

Taxonomy
Bossiaea cordigera was first formally described in 1856 by Joseph Dalton Hooker in The Botany of the Antarctic voyage of H.M. Discovery ships Erebus and Terror. III. Flora Tasmaniae, based on an unpublished description by George Bentham. The specific epithet (cordigera) means "heart-bearing".

Distribution and habitat
Wiry bossiaea grows in open forest, often in moist places and occurs between Portland and Healesville in southern Victoria and in the north and east of Tasmania..

References

cordigera
Mirbelioids
Flora of Tasmania
Flora of Victoria (Australia)
Taxa named by Joseph Dalton Hooker
Plants described in 1856